South Mountain is a mountain located in the Catskill Mountains of New York south of Walton. Walton Mountain is located west-northwest, Bear Spring Mountain is located north, and Houck Mountain is located south of South Mountain.

References

Mountains of Delaware County, New York
Mountains of New York (state)